{{DISPLAYTITLE:Eta1 Hydri}}

Eta1 Hydri, Latinized from η1 Hydri, is a blue-white hued star in the southern constellation of Hydrus. It has an apparent visual magnitude of 6.76, which may be too faint to be visible to the naked eye. At that distance, the visual magnitude of the star is diminished by 0.10 magnitudes of extinction due to interstellar dust. The star is drifting further away with a heliocentric radial velocity of +15 km/s.

This is a B-type main-sequence star with a stellar classification of B9 V that was suspected in 1939 by Herbert Schneller of being variable. However, this may have been based on a photographic plate that was later rejected.  It is listed in the General Catalogue of Variable Stars, but marked as probably constant.

The star is about 311 million years old and is radiating 91 times the luminosity of the Sun from its photosphere at an effective temperature of 9,816 K.

References

B-type main-sequence stars
Suspected variables

Hydrus (constellation)
Hydri, Eta1
Durchmusterung objects
011733
008751